Adam Cook may refer to:

 Adam Cook (cricketer) (born 1979), former English cricketer
 Adam Cook (rugby league, born 2000), Australian rugby league footballer
 Adam Watene (1977–2008), known as Adam Cook early in his career, Cook Islander rugby league footballer
 Adam Cook, character in 1951 American film An American in Paris